Kanchan Rup is a Municipality in Saptari District in the Sagarmatha Zone of south-eastern Nepal. This municipality was formed on 18 May 2014 by merging nine villages around it i.e. Baramjhiya, Badgama, Theliya, Jagatpur, Kanchanpur, Pipra (Purba), Rupnagar, Dharmpur and Ghoghanpur and Bakal.

Schools 
 List of educational institutions in Kanchan Rup

References 

Populated places in Saptari District
Nepal municipalities established in 2014
VDCs in Saptari District
Municipalities in Madhesh Province